In a Year of 13 Moons is a 1978 West German drama film directed by Rainer Werner Fassbinder and starring Volker Spengler. The film was made in response to the suicide of Fassbinder's lover at the time, Armin Meier. In a "Top 10" list of his own films, Fassbinder placed In a Year of 13 Moons second, after Beware of a Holy Whore.

Cast
 Volker Spengler as Erwin / Elvira Weishaupt
 Ingrid Caven as Rote Zora
 Gottfried John as Anton Saitz
 Elisabeth Trissenaar as Irene Weishaupt
 Eva Mattes as Marie-Ann Weishaupt
 Günther Kaufmann as J. Smolik, chauffeur
 Lilo Pempeit as Sister Gudrun (as Liselotte Pempeit)
 Isolde Barth as Sybille
 Karl Scheydt as Christoph Hacker
 Walter Bockmayer as Soul-Frieda
 Peter Kollek as alcoholic
 Bob Dorsay as city tramp
 Gerhard Zwerenz as Burghard Hauser, writer

Notes

References

External links

Official website at the Fassbinder Foundation

1978 films
1978 drama films
1978 LGBT-related films
German drama films
German LGBT-related films
West German films
Films about suicide
Films directed by Rainer Werner Fassbinder
Films shot in Germany
Films about trans women
Films set in Frankfurt
1970s German films